Hiroyasu Tanaka (Japanese:田中 浩康, born May 24, 1982) is a Japanese former professional baseballer.

External links

1982 births
Living people
Baseball people from Kyoto Prefecture
Waseda University alumni
Japanese baseball players
Nippon Professional Baseball infielders
Yakult Swallows players
Tokyo Yakult Swallows players
Yokohama DeNA BayStars players
Japanese baseball coaches
Nippon Professional Baseball coaches